Kangkong is a town in Kedah, Malaysia.

Towns in Kedah
Gurun (Malaysia)